Thecadactylus is a gekko genus from the tropical Americas. They are known as the turnip-tailed geckos. The genus belongs to the gecko family Phyllodactylidae. Until 2007, it was believed to be monotypic, with T. rapicauda the sole species. Then however, the population from upstream southern Amazon basin was discovered to be very distinct and was named a new species, T. solimoensis. A third species was described in 2011.

 Thecadactylus oskrobapreinorum Köhler & Vesely, 2011
 Thecadactylus rapicauda Houttuyn, 1782 – turniptail gecko
 Thecadactylus solimoensis Bergmann & Russell, 2007

References

Georg August Goldfuss|Goldfuss, G.A. 1820. Reptilia. pp. 121–181 In:  Handbuch der Naturgeschichte zum Gebrauch bei Vorlesungen. Vol. 3. Handbuch der Zoologie. J.L. Schrag: Nürnberg.

T
Lizard genera
Lizards of Central America
Lizards of South America
Lizards of the Caribbean
Taxa named by Lorenz Oken